The following is a list of the power stations in Israel.

Coal

Orot Rabin is since 2016 in the process of being converted to natural gas (see article).

Gas

Solar 
Ashalim power station
Ketura Sun
Neot Hovav

Pumped storage hydroelectricity 
Kokhav Hayarden Pumped Storage Power Station

See also

Energy in Israel
List of largest power stations in the world

References

 
Israel
Power stations